The Eighth Municipality (In Italian: Ottava Municipalità or Municipalità 8) is one of the ten boroughs in which the Italian city of Naples is divided.

Geography
The municipality represents the northernmost suburb of the city and borders with Arzano, Casandrino, Melito di Napoli, Mugnano di Napoli and Marano di Napoli.

Its territory includes the zone of Marianella and Santa Croce.

Administrative division
The Eighth Municipality is divided into 3 quarters:

References

External links
 Municipalità 8 page on Naples website

Municipality 08